East Coweta School may refer to:
East Coweta High School
East Coweta Middle School